The genus Cyperus contains the following species recognised by The Plant List in 2015. Other species have since been considered synonyms, been newly described, or seem to have been omitted from the website database at the time. See references.

A 
Cyperus absconditicoronatus Bauters, Reynders & Goetgh.
Cyperus acholiensis Larridon
Cyperus acuminatus Torr. & Hook.
Cyperus afroalpinus Lye
Cyperus afrodunensis Lye
Cyperus afromontanus Lye
Cyperus afrovaricus Lye
Cyperus aggregatus (Willd.) Endl.
Cyperus ajax C.B.Clarke
Cyperus alaticaulis R.Booth, D.J.Moore & Hodgon
Cyperus albopilosus (C.B.Clarke) Kük.
Cyperus albopurpureus Cherm.
Cyperus albosanguineus Kük.
Cyperus albostriatus Schrad.
Cyperus albus J.Presl & C.Presl
Cyperus algeriensis Väre & Kukkonen
Cyperus almensis D.A.Simpson
Cyperus alopecuroides Rottb.
Cyperus alterniflorus R.Br.
Cyperus alternifolius L.
Cyperus altochrysocephalus Lye
Cyperus altomicroglumis Lye
Cyperus altsonii Kük.
Cyperus alulatus J.Kern
Cyperus alvesii G.C.Tucker
Cyperus amabilis Vahl
Cyperus amauropus Steud.
Cyperus amuricus Maxim.
Cyperus anderssonii Boeckeler
Cyperus androhibensis D.A.Simpson
Cyperus angolensis Boeckeler
Cyperus angustatus R.Br.
Cyperus anisitsii Kük.
Cyperus ankaizinensis Cherm.
Cyperus ankaratrensis Cherm.
Cyperus antillanus (Kük.) O'Neill
Cyperus appendiculatus (Brongn.) Kunth
Cyperus aquatilis R.Br.
Cyperus arenarius Retz.
Cyperus armstrongii Benth.
Cyperus arsenei O'Neill & Ben.Ayers
Cyperus articulatus L.
Cyperus astartodes K.L.Wilson
Cyperus aster (C.B.Clarke ex Cherm.) Kük.
Cyperus aterrimus Hochst. ex Steud.
Cyperus atkinsonii C.B.Clarke
Cyperus atractocarpus Ridl.
Cyperus aucheri Jaub. & Spach
Cyperus aureoalatus Lye
Cyperus aureobrunneus C.B.Clarke
Cyperus auriculatus Nees & Meyen ex Kunth
Cyperus aurifer Cherm.
Cyperus austrochrysanthus Lye

B 
Cyperus babakan Steud.
Cyperus badius Poir.
Cyperus balfourii C.B.Clarke
Cyperus baobab Lye
Cyperus baoulensis Kük.
Cyperus baronii C.B.Clarke
Cyperus bellus Kunth
Cyperus benadirensis Chiov.
Cyperus bernieri Cherm.
Cyperus berroi (C.B.Clarke) Barros
Cyperus betafensis Cherm.
Cyperus betchei (Kük.) S.T.Blake
Cyperus beyrichii (Schrad. ex Nees) Steud.
Cyperus bifolius Lye
Cyperus bipartitus Torr.
Cyperus blakeanus K.L.Wilson
Cyperus blysmoides Hochst. ex C.B.Clarke
Cyperus bonariensis G.C.Tucker
Cyperus boreobellus Lye
Cyperus boreochrysocephalus Lye
Cyperus boreohemisphaericus Lye
Cyperus bowmanni F.Muell. ex Benth.
Cyperus breedlovei G.C.Tucker
Cyperus breviculmis R.Br.
Cyperus brumadoi D.A.Simpson
Cyperus brunneofibrosus Lye
Cyperus brunnescens Boeckeler
Cyperus bulamensis Steud.
Cyperus bulbosus Vahl
Cyperus burkartii Guagl.

C 
Cyperus caesius Boeckeler
Cyperus calderoniae S.González
Cyperus callistus Ridl.
Cyperus camphoratus Liebm.
Cyperus cancrorum Cherm.
Cyperus canus J.Presl & C.Presl
Cyperus capensis (Steud.) Endl.
Cyperus capitatus Vand.
Cyperus carinatus R.Br.
Cyperus castaneobellus Lye
Cyperus castaneus Willd.
Cyperus cearaensis Gross ex Kük.
Cyperus celans Kukkonen
Cyperus cellulosoreticulatus Boeckeler
Cyperus centralis K.L.Wilson
Cyperus cephalanthus Torr. & Hook.
Cyperus cephalotes Vahl
Cyperus chaetophyllus (Chiov.) Kük.
Cyperus chalaranthus J.Presl & C.Presl
Cyperus chamaecephalus Cherm.
Cyperus chermezonianus Robyns & Tournay
Cyperus chersinus (N.E.Br.) Kük.
Cyperus chevalieri Kük.
Cyperus chinsalensis Podlech
Cyperus chionocephalus (Chiov.) Chiov. ex Chiarugi
Cyperus chlorocephalus (C.B.Clarke) Kük.
Cyperus chordorrhizus Chiov.
Cyperus chorisanthus C.B.Clarke
Cyperus chrysocephalus (K.Schum.) Kük.
Cyperus ciliatus Jungh.
Cyperus cinereobrunneus Kük.
Cyperus clarkei T.Cooke
Cyperus clarus S.T.Blake
Cyperus clavinux C.B.Clarke
Cyperus columbiensis Palla
Cyperus colymbetes Kotschy & Peyr.
Cyperus commixtus Kük.
Cyperus compactus Retz.
Cyperus compressus L.
Cyperus concinnus R.Br.
Cyperus confertus Sw.
Cyperus congensis C.B.Clarke
Cyperus congestus Vahl
Cyperus conglomeratus Rottb.
Cyperus conicus (R.Br.) Boeckeler
Cyperus consors C.B.Clarke
Cyperus constanzae Urb.
Cyperus coriifolius Boeckeler
Cyperus cornelii-ostenii Kük.
Cyperus coronarius (Vahl) Kunth
Cyperus correllii (T.Koyama) G.C.Tucker
Cyperus corymbosus Rottb.
Cyperus costaricensis Gómez-Laur.
Cyperus cracens K.L.Wilson
Cyperus crassipes Vahl
Cyperus cremeomariscus Lye
Cyperus crispulus K.L.Wilson
Cyperus cristulatus S.T.Blake
Cyperus croceus Vahl
Cyperus cruentus Rottb.
Cyperus crypsoides J.Kern
Cyperus cundudoensis Chiov.
Cyperus cunninghamii (C.B.Clarke) C.A.Gardner
Cyperus curvistylis J.Kern
Cyperus cuspidatus Kunth
Cyperus cylindrostachys Boeckeler
Cyperus cymulosus Willemet
Cyperus cyperinus (Retz.) Suringar
Cyperus cyperoides (L.) Kuntze
Cyperus cyprius Post

D 
Cyperus dactyliformis Boeckeler
Cyperus dactylotes Benth.
Cyperus davidsei G.C.Tucker
Cyperus × deamii O'Neill
Cyperus debilis R.Br.
Cyperus debilissimus Baker
Cyperus deciduus Boeckeler
Cyperus decompositus (R.Br.) F.Muell.
Cyperus densibulbosus Lye
Cyperus dentatus Torr.
Cyperus dentoniae G.C.Tucker
Cyperus denudatus L.f.
Cyperus derreilema Steud.
Cyperus diamantinus (D.A.Simpson) Govaerts
Cyperus dianae Steud.
Cyperus dichromeniformis Kunth
Cyperus dichromus C.B.Clarke
Cyperus dichrostachyus Hochst. ex A.Rich.
Cyperus dietrichiae Boeckeler
Cyperus difformis L.
Cyperus diffusus Vahl
Cyperus digitatus Roxb.
Cyperus dilatatus Schumach.
Cyperus dioicus I.M.Johnst.
Cyperus dipsaceus Liebm.
Cyperus disjunctus C.B.Clarke
Cyperus distans L.f.
Cyperus distinctus Steud.
Cyperus diurensis Boeckeler
Cyperus dives Delile
Cyperus diwakarii Wad.Khan & Solanke
Cyperus drakensbergensis (Vorster) Govaerts
Cyperus dregeanus Kunth
Cyperus drummondii Torr. & Hook.
Cyperus dubius Rottb.
Cyperus duclouxii E.G.Camus
Cyperus dunensis (Cherm.) Kük.
Cyperus duripes I.M.Johnst.
Cyperus durus Kunth

E 
Cyperus eboracensis R.Booth, D.J.Moore & Hodgon
Cyperus echinatus (L.) Alph.Wood
Cyperus eglobosus K.L.Wilson
Cyperus ekmanii Kük.
Cyperus elatus L.
Cyperus elegans L.
Cyperus elephantinus (C.B.Clarke) C.B.Clarke
Cyperus endlichii Kük.
Cyperus enervis R.Br.
Cyperus entrerianus Boeckeler
Cyperus ephemerus Kukkonen & Väre
Cyperus eragrostis Lam.
Cyperus eremicus Kukkonen
Cyperus erythrorhizos Muhl.
Cyperus esculentus L.
Cyperus exaltatus Retz.
Cyperus exilis Willd. ex Kunth
Cyperus expansus Poir.

F 
Cyperus fastigiatus Rottb.
Cyperus fauriei Kük.
Cyperus feani F.Br.
Cyperus felipponei Kük.
Cyperus fendlerianus Boeckeler
Cyperus ferrugineoviridis (C.B.Clarke) Kük.
Cyperus fertilis Boeckeler
Cyperus filiculmis Vahl
Cyperus filifolius Willd. ex Kunth
Cyperus filiformis Sw.
Cyperus filipes Benth.
Cyperus fischerianus Schimp. ex A.Rich.
Cyperus fissus Steud.
Cyperus flaccidus R.Br.
Cyperus flavoculmis Lye
Cyperus flexuosus Vahl
Cyperus floribundus (Kük.) R.Carter & S.D.Jones
Cyperus floridanus Britton
Cyperus foliaceus C.B.Clarke
Cyperus forskalianus Väre & Kukkonen
Cyperus friburgensis Boeckeler
Cyperus fucosus K.L.Wilson
Cyperus fulgens C.B.Clarke
Cyperus fuligineus Chapm.
Cyperus fulvoalbescens T.Koyama
Cyperus fulvus R.Br.
Cyperus fuscescens Willd. ex Link
Cyperus fuscovaginatus Kük.
Cyperus fuscus L.

G 
Cyperus gardneri Nees
Cyperus gayi (C.B.Clarke) Kük.
Cyperus giganteus Vahl
Cyperus gigantobulbes Lye
Cyperus gilesii Benth.
Cyperus glaber L.
Cyperus glaucophyllus Boeckeler
Cyperus glomeratus L.
Cyperus graciliculmis Lye
Cyperus gracilis R.Br.
Cyperus granatensis C.B.Clarke
Cyperus grandibulbosus C.B.Clarke
Cyperus grandifolius J.G.Anderson
Cyperus grandis C.B.Clarke
Cyperus grandisimplex C.B.Clarke
Cyperus granitophilus McVaugh
Cyperus grayi Torr.
Cyperus grayioides Mohlenbr.
Cyperus grossianus Pedersen
Cyperus gubanii Väre & Kukkonen
Cyperus guianensis (C.B.Clarke) Kük.
Cyperus gunnii Hook.f.
Cyperus gymnocaulos Steud.
Cyperus gypsophilus Lye

H 
Cyperus haematocephalus Boeckeler ex C.B.Clarke
Cyperus hainanensis (Chun & F.C.How) G.C.Tucker
Cyperus hakonensis Franch. & Sav.
Cyperus hamulosus M.Bieb.
Cyperus harrisii Kük.
Cyperus haspan L.
Cyperus hayesii (C.B.Clarke) Standl.
Cyperus helferi Boeckeler
Cyperus hemisphaericus Boeckeler
Cyperus hensii C.B.Clarke
Cyperus hermaphroditus (Jacq.) Standl.
Cyperus hesperius K.L.Wilson
Cyperus heterocladus Baker
Cyperus hieronymi Boeckeler
Cyperus hilairenus Steud.
Cyperus hilgendorfianus Boeckeler
Cyperus hillebrandii Boeckeler
Cyperus hirtellus (Chiov.) Kük.
Cyperus holoschoenus R.Br.
Cyperus holostigma C.B.Clarke ex Schweinf.
Cyperus holstii Kük.
Cyperus hoppiifolius Uittien
Cyperus houghtonii Torr.
Cyperus humilis Kunth
Cyperus hypochlorus Hillebr.
Cyperus hypopitys G.C.Tucker
Cyperus hystricinus Fernald

I 
Cyperus imbecillis R.Br.
Cyperus imbricatus Retz.
Cyperus impolitus Kunth
Cyperus impubes Steud.
Cyperus inaequalis Willemet
Cyperus incompressus C.B.Clarke
Cyperus incomtus Kunth
Cyperus indecorus Kunth
Cyperus infucatus Kunth
Cyperus inops C.B.Clarke
Cyperus × insidiosus Cherm.
Cyperus insularis Heenan & de Lange
Cyperus intricatus Schrad. ex Schult.
Cyperus iria L.
Cyperus isabellinus K.L.Wilson
Cyperus ischnos Schltdl.
Cyperus ivohibensis (Cherm.) Kük.
Cyperus ixiocarpus F.Muell.

J 
Cyperus javanicus Houtt.
Cyperus jeminicus Rottb.
Cyperus juncelliformis Peter & Kük.

K 
Cyperus kabarensis Cherm.
Cyperus kaessneri C.B.Clarke
Cyperus kappleri Hochst. ex Steud.
Cyperus karisimbiensis (Cherm.) Kük.
Cyperus karlschumannii C.B.Clarke
Cyperus karthikeyanii Wad.Khan & Lakshmin.
Cyperus kasamensis Podlech
Cyperus kerstenii Boeckeler
Cyperus kibweanus J.Duvign.
Cyperus kilimandscharicus Kük.
Cyperus kipasensis Cherm.
Cyperus kirkii C.B.Clarke
Cyperus kituiensis Muasya
Cyperus koyaliensis Cherm.
Cyperus kurzii C.B.Clarke
Cyperus kwaleensis Lye
Cyperus kyllingiella Larridon
Cyperus kyllingiformis Lye

L 
Cyperus lacunosus Griseb.
Cyperus laeteflorens (C.B.Clarke) Kük.
Cyperus laetus J.Presl & C.Presl
Cyperus laevigatus L.
Cyperus laevis R.Br.
Cyperus lancastriensis Porter
Cyperus lateriticus J.Raynal
Cyperus latifolius Poir.
Cyperus latzii K.L.Wilson
Cyperus laxiflorus Poir.
Cyperus laxus Lam.
Cyperus lecontei Torr. ex Steud.
Cyperus leiocaulon Benth.
Cyperus lentiginosus Millsp. & Chase
Cyperus leptocladus Kunth
Cyperus leucocephalus Retz.
Cyperus lhotskyanus Beck
Cyperus ligularis L.
Cyperus limiticola Larridon & Reynders
Cyperus limosus Maxim.
Cyperus linearispiculatus T.L.Dai
Cyperus locuples C.B.Clarke
Cyperus longifolius Poir.
Cyperus longi-involucratus Lye
Cyperus longispicula Muasya & D.A.Simpson
Cyperus longistylus Kük.
Cyperus longus L.
Cyperus lucidus R.Br.
Cyperus luerssenii Boeckeler
Cyperus lundellii O'Neill
Cyperus lupulinus (Spreng.) Marcks
Cyperus luteus Boeckeler
Cyperus luzulae (L.) Retz.

M 
Cyperus macer C.B.Clarke
Cyperus macropachycephalus Goetgh.
Cyperus macrophyllus (Brongn.) Boeckeler
Cyperus macrorrhizus Nees
Cyperus maculatus Boeckeler
Cyperus maderaspatanus Willd.
Cyperus malaccensis Lam.
Cyperus mangorensis Cherm.
Cyperus manimae Kunth
Cyperus mapanioides C.B.Clarke
Cyperus maranguensis K.Schum.
Cyperus margaritaceus Vahl
Cyperus marginatus Thunb.
Cyperus marlothii Boeckeler
Cyperus marojejyensis Bosser
Cyperus marquisensis F.Br.
Cyperus matagoroensis Muasya & D.A.Simpson
Cyperus matudae G.C.Tucker
Cyperus mauretaniensis Väre & Kukkonen
Cyperus medusaeus Chiov.
Cyperus meeboldii Kük.
Cyperus megalanthus (Kük.) G.C.Tucker
Cyperus meistostylus S.T.Blake
Cyperus meridionalis Barros
Cyperus × mesochorus Geise
Cyperus meyenianus Kunth
Cyperus meyerianus Kunth
Cyperus michelianus (L.) Delile
Cyperus michoacanensis Britton ex C.B.Clarke
Cyperus micrantherus Cherm.
Cyperus microbolbos C.B.Clarke
Cyperus microbrunneus G.C.Tucker
Cyperus microcephalus R.Br.
Cyperus microcristatus Lye
Cyperus microglumis D.A.Simpson
Cyperus microiria Steud.
Cyperus micromariscus Lye
Cyperus micromedusaeus Lye
Cyperus micropelophilus Lye
Cyperus microumbellatus Lye
Cyperus miliifolius Poepp. & Kunth
Cyperus mirus C.B.Clarke
Cyperus mitis Steud.
Cyperus mogadoxensis Chiov.
Cyperus molliglumis Cherm.
Cyperus mollipes (C.B.Clarke) K.Schum.
Cyperus monospermus (S.M.Huang) G.C.Tucker
Cyperus moutona F.Br.
Cyperus mudugensis D.A.Simpson
Cyperus muliifolius Poepp. & Kunth
Cyperus multifolius Kunth
Cyperus multinervatus Bosser
Cyperus multispicatus Boeckeler
Cyperus multispiceus R.Booth, D.J.Moore & Hodgon
Cyperus mundulus Kunth
Cyperus muniziae G.C.Tucker
Cyperus mutisii (Kunth) Andersson
Cyperus mwinilungensis Podlech
Cyperus myrmecias Ridl.

N 
Cyperus nanellus Tang & F.T.Wang
Cyperus nanus Willd.
Cyperus natalensis Hochst. ex C.Krauss
Cyperus nayaritensis G.C.Tucker
Cyperus nduru Cherm.
Cyperus nemoralis Cherm.
Cyperus neoguinensis Kük.
Cyperus neokunthianus Kük.
Cyperus nervulosus (Kük.) S.T.Blake
Cyperus nervosostriatus Turrill
Cyperus niger Ruiz y Pavón
Cyperus nigrofuscus T.L.Dai
Cyperus niigatensis Ohwi
Cyperus nipponicus Franch. & Sav.
Cyperus niveoides C.B.Clarke
Cyperus niveus Retz.
Cyperus noeanus Boiss.
Cyperus nudiceps (C.B.Clarke ex Standl.) O'Neill
Cyperus nutans Vahl
Cyperus nyasensis (Podlech) Lye
Cyperus nyererei Lye

O 
Cyperus obbiadensis Chiov.
Cyperus oblongoincrassatus Kük.
Cyperus obtusus Willemet
Cyperus ochraceus Vahl
Cyperus odoratus L.
Cyperus ohwii Kük.
Cyperus onerosus M.C.Johnst.
Cyperus orgadophilus K.L.Wilson
Cyperus ornatus R.Br.
Cyperus orthostachyus Franch. & Sav.
Cyperus ossicaulis Lye
Cyperus ovatus Baldwin
Cyperus owanii Boeckeler
Cyperus oxycarpus S.T.Blake
Cyperus oxylepis Nees ex Steud.

P 
Cyperus pachycephalus J.Kern
Cyperus pacificus (Ohwi) Ohwi
Cyperus palianparaiensis Govind.
Cyperus pallidicolor (Kük.) G.C.Tucker
Cyperus panamensis (C.B.Clarke) Britton ex Standl.
Cyperus pandanophyllum C.B.Clarke
Cyperus pangorei Rottb.
Cyperus paniceus (Rottb.) Boeckeler
Cyperus pannonicus Jacq.
Cyperus paolii Chiov.
Cyperus papyrus L.
Cyperus parishii Britton
Cyperus pearcei C.B.Clarke
Cyperus pectinatus Vahl
Cyperus pedunculosus F.Muell.
Cyperus pendulus Cherm.
Cyperus penicillatus Conz.
Cyperus pennatiformis Kük.
Cyperus pennellii O'Neill & Ben.Ayers
Cyperus pentabracteatus Govind. & Hemadri
Cyperus penzoanus Pic.Serm.
Cyperus perangustus S.T.Blake
Cyperus perennis (M.E.Jones) O'Neill
Cyperus permacer C.B.Clarke
Cyperus pernambucensis Steud.
Cyperus perrieri (Cherm.) Hoenselaar
Cyperus pertenuis Roxb.
Cyperus phaeolepis Cherm.
Cyperus phillipsiae (C.B.Clarke) Kük.
Cyperus phleoides (Nees ex Kunth) H.Mann
Cyperus picardae Boeckeler
Cyperus pilosulus (C.B.Clarke) K.Schum. ex Kük.
Cyperus pilosus Vahl
Cyperus pinetorum Britton
Cyperus planifolius Rich.
Cyperus plantaginifolius Cherm.
Cyperus plateilema (Steud.) Kük.
Cyperus platycaulis Baker
Cyperus platyphyllus Roem. & Schult.
Cyperus platystylis R.Br.
Cyperus plukenetii Fernald
Cyperus pluribracteatus (Kük.) Govaerts
Cyperus pluricephalus Lye
Cyperus plurinervosus Bodard
Cyperus podocarpus Boeckeler
Cyperus poecilus C.B.Clarke
Cyperus poeppigii Kunth
Cyperus pohlii (Nees) Steud.
Cyperus polyanthelus Govind.
Cyperus polystachyos Rottb.
Cyperus portae-tartari K.L.Wilson
Cyperus praemorsus Boeckeler
Cyperus pratensis Boeckeler
Cyperus procerus Rottb.
Cyperus prolifer Lam.
Cyperus prolixus Kunth
Cyperus psammophilus Cherm.
Cyperus pseuderemicus Kukkonen & Väre
Cyperus pseudobrunneus (C.B.Clarke ex Cherm.) Kük.
Cyperus pseudodistans Uittien
Cyperus pseudopetiolatus G.C.Tucker
Cyperus pseudopilosus (C.B.Clarke) Govaerts
Cyperus pseudosomaliensis Kük.
Cyperus pseudothyrsiflorus (Kük.) R.Carter & S.D.Jones
Cyperus pseudovegetus Steud.
Cyperus pseudovestitus (C.B.Clarke) Kük.
Cyperus pubens Kük.
Cyperus pulchellus R.Br.
Cyperus pulcher Thunb.
Cyperus pulcherrimus Willd. ex Kunth
Cyperus pulguerensis M.T.Strong
Cyperus pulicaris Kük.
Cyperus purpureoviridis Lye
Cyperus pustulatus Vahl
Cyperus pycnostachyus (Kunth) Kunth
Cyperus pygmaeus Rottb.

R 
Cyperus radians Nees & Meyen ex Kunth
Cyperus ramosus (Benth.) Kük.
Cyperus rapensis F.Br.
Cyperus recurvispicatus Lye
Cyperus redolens Maury ex Micheli
Cyperus reduncus Hochst. ex Boeckeler
Cyperus reflexus Vahl
Cyperus refractus Engelm. ex Boeckeler
Cyperus regiomontanus Britton
Cyperus rehmii Merxm.
Cyperus remotispicatus S.S.Hooper
Cyperus remotus (C.B.Clarke) Kük.
Cyperus renschii Boeckeler
Cyperus retroflexus Buckley
Cyperus retrofractus (L.) Torr.
Cyperus retrorsus Chapm.
Cyperus rheophyticus Lye
Cyperus rhynchosporoides Kük.
Cyperus rigens J.Presl & C.Presl
Cyperus rigidellus (Benth.) J.M.Black
Cyperus rigidifolius Steud.
Cyperus rockii Kük.
Cyperus rohlfsii Boeckeler
Cyperus rotundus L.
Cyperus rubicundus Vahl
Cyperus rufostriatus C.B.Clarke ex Cherm.
Cyperus rupestris Kunth
Cyperus rupicola S.T.Blake

S 
Cyperus sahelii Väre & Kukkonen
Cyperus sandwicensis Kük.
Cyperus sanguineoater Boeckeler
Cyperus sartorii Kük.
Cyperus scaber (R.Br.) Boeckeler
Cyperus scabricaulis Lye
Cyperus scariosus R.Br.
Cyperus schaffneri Boeckeler
Cyperus schimperianus Steud.
Cyperus schinzii Boeckeler
Cyperus schlechteri C.B.Clarke
Cyperus schoenomorphus Steud.
Cyperus schomburgkianus Nees
Cyperus schweinfurthii (Chiov.) Kük.
Cyperus schweinitzii Torr.
Cyperus sciaphilus Cherm.
Cyperus scleropodus Chiov.
Cyperus sculptus S.T.Blake
Cyperus secubans K.L.Wilson
Cyperus seemannianus Boeckeler
Cyperus semifertilis S.T.Blake
Cyperus semiochraceus Boeckeler
Cyperus semitrifidus Schrad.
Cyperus sensilis Baijnath
Cyperus serotinus Rottb.
Cyperus seslerioides Kunth
Cyperus setiger Torr. & Hook.
Cyperus sexangularis Nees
Cyperus sexflorus R.Br.
Cyperus sharonensis Danin & Kukkonen
Cyperus sharpei R.Booth, D.J.Moore & Hodgon
Cyperus sieberianus Spreng.
Cyperus sikkimensis Kük.
Cyperus silletensis Nees
Cyperus simaoensis Y.Y.Qian
Cyperus simplex Kunth
Cyperus simpsonii (Muasya) Larridon
Cyperus solidifolius Boeckeler
Cyperus solidus Kunth
Cyperus somalidunensis Lye
Cyperus somaliensis C.B.Clarke
Cyperus soongoricus Kar. & Kir.
Cyperus sordidus J.Presl & C.Presl
Cyperus soyauxii Boeckeler
Cyperus spectabilis Link
Cyperus sphacelatus Rottb.
Cyperus sphaerocephalus Vahl
Cyperus sphaeroideus L.A.S.Johnson & O.D.Evans
Cyperus sphaerolepis Boeckeler
Cyperus sphaerospermus Schrad.
Cyperus spiciger Vahl
Cyperus spiralis Larridon
Cyperus splendens (Cherm.) Kük.
Cyperus sporobolus R.Br.
Cyperus squarrosus L.
Cyperus steadii Kük.
Cyperus stenophyllus J.V.Suringar
Cyperus stergiosii G.C.Tucker
Cyperus steudneri (Boeckeler) Larridon
Cyperus stewartii G.C.Tucker
Cyperus stolonifer Retz.
Cyperus stradbrokensis Domin
Cyperus stramineoferrugineus Kük.
Cyperus strigosus L.
Cyperus subaequalis Baker
Cyperus subbadius Kük.
Cyperus subcaracasanus Kük.
Cyperus subcastaneus D.A.Simpson
Cyperus subfuscus Debeaux
Cyperus submicrolepis Kük.
Cyperus subpapuanus Kük.
Cyperus subtenax Kük.
Cyperus subtenuis (Kük.) M.T.Strong
Cyperus subtilis (Kük.) Väre & Kukkonen
Cyperus subulatus R.Br.
Cyperus sulcinux C.B.Clarke
Cyperus surinamensis Rottb.
Cyperus svensonii G.C.Tucker
Cyperus swartzii (A.Dietr.) Boeckeler ex Kük.
Cyperus szechuanensis T.Koyama

T 
Cyperus tabina Steud. ex Boeckeler
Cyperus tabularis Schrad.
Cyperus tacnensis Nees & Meyen
Cyperus tanganyicanus (Kük.) Lye
Cyperus tanyphyllus Ridl.
Cyperus tatandaensis Muasya & D.A.Simpson
Cyperus tempeae G.C.Tucker
Cyperus tenax Boeckeler
Cyperus tenellus L.f.
Cyperus tenerrimus J.Presl & C.Presl
Cyperus tenuiculmis Boeckeler
Cyperus tenuiflorus Rottb.
Cyperus tenuis Sw.
Cyperus tenuispica Steud.
Cyperus tenuispiculatus Boeckeler
Cyperus tetracarpus Boeckeler
Cyperus tetraformis Desv.
Cyperus tetragonus Elliott
Cyperus tetraphyllus R.Br.
Cyperus textilis Thunb.
Cyperus thomsonii Boeckeler
Cyperus thorelii E.G.Camus
Cyperus thorncroftii McClean
Cyperus thunbergii Vahl
Cyperus thyrsiflorus Jungh. ex Schltdl.
Cyperus tomaiophyllus K.Schum.
Cyperus tonkinensis C.B.Clarke
Cyperus trachysanthos Hook. & Arn.
Cyperus trailii C.B.Clarke
Cyperus trialatus (Boeckeler) J.Kern
Cyperus trichodes Griseb.
Cyperus trigonellus Suess.
Cyperus trinervis R.Br.
Cyperus trisulcus D.Don
Cyperus × turbatus Baijnath
Cyperus turrialbanus Gómez-Laur.
Cyperus turrillii Kük.
Cyperus tweediei C.B.Clarke

U 
Cyperus uncinulatus Schrad. ex Nees
Cyperus undulatus Kük.
Cyperus unicolor Boeckeler
Cyperus unifolius Boeckeler
Cyperus unispicatus Bauters, Reynders & Goetgh.
Cyperus urbani Boeckeler
Cyperus usitatus Burch. ex Roem. & Schult.
Cyperus ustulatus A.Rich.

V 
Cyperus vaginatus R.Br.
Cyperus vandervekenii Reynders, Dhooge & Goetgh.
Cyperus varicus (C.B.Clarke ex Cherm.) Kük.
Cyperus ventricosus R.Br.
Cyperus vestitus Hochst. ex C.Krauss
Cyperus victoriensis C.B.Clarke
Cyperus virens Michx.
Cyperus viscidulus K.L.Wilson
Cyperus volckmannii Phil.
Cyperus volodia Cherm.
Cyperus vorsteri K.L.Wilson

W 
Cyperus wallichianus Spreng.
Cyperus whitmeei (C.B.Clarke) Kük.
Cyperus wilburii G.C.Tucker
Cyperus wissmannii O.Schwartz

X 
Cyperus xanthostachyus Steud.
Cyperus xerophilus Cherm.

Y 
Cyperus yadavii Wad.Khan, D.P.Chavan & Solanke

Z 
Cyperus zollingeri Steud.
Cyperus zollingerioides C.B.Clarke

Formerly accepted species 
The following taxa were accepted in The Plant List in 2015, but are no longer considered valid.
Cyperus cyrtolepis Torr. & Hook. – now Cyperus acuminatus
Cyperus involucratus Rottb. - now Cyperus alternifolius
Cyperus variabilis Salzm. ex Steud. – now Cyperus esculentus
Cyperus zanzibarensis C.B.Clarke - now Cyperus pulchellus

References

List
Cyperus
Cyperus